The Marches Local Enterprise Partnership (TM LEP) is one of 39 Local Enterprise Partnerships set up by the UK Government to drive economic development in England.

Established in May 2011, the LEP covers the geographical boundaries of the local authorities of the counties of Herefordshire and Shropshire in the West Midlands region. The LEP works to generate funding, projects and investment into the two counties. Although a separate authority, Telford and Wrekin are also part of the LEP.

The LEP covers the following towns and cities of Herefordshire and Shropshire:

Herefordshire:
Bromyard
Hereford (County town of Herefordshire)
Ledbury
Leominster
Kington
Ross-on-Wye

Shropshire:
Bishop's Castle
Bridgnorth
Broseley
Church Stretton
Cleobury Mortimer
Craven Arms
Ellesmere
Ludlow
Market Drayton
Much Wenlock
Oswestry
Shifnal
Shrewsbury (County town of Shropshire)
Wem
Whitchurch

Telford and Wrekin
Dawley
Ironbridge
Ketley
Madeley
Newport
Oakengates
Telford
Wellington

References

Local enterprise partnerships
Economy of Shropshire
Economy of Herefordshire